Saigon Water Park is a former water park in Thủ Đức District, Ho Chi Minh City. It was the first park of its kind built in the city. The park was situated on Saigon River. It existed from 1997 to 2006.

Financial difficulties
The park encountered financial difficulty after the opening of a number of other competitor water parks in Ho Chi Minh City. Investors are in the process of re-zoning the land from leisure to residential. All of the water park's equipment has been sold and removed. Many guide-books and travel websites still refer tourists to this tourist attraction, although it has closed.

See also
 List of water parks

References

Buildings and structures in Ho Chi Minh City
Water parks
Defunct amusement parks